The 2017–18 Welsh Alliance League, known as the Lock Stock Welsh Alliance League for sponsorship reasons, is the 34th season of the Welsh Alliance League, which consists of two divisions: the third and fourth levels of the Welsh football pyramid.

There are fifteen teams in each division, with the champions of Division 1 promoted to the Cymru Alliance and the bottom two relegated to Division 2. In Division 2, the champions and runners-up are promoted to Division 1, with the bottom two relegated to either the Gwynedd League or the Vale of Clwyd and Conwy Football League.

The season began on 12 August 2017 and concluded on 26 May 2018.

Division 1

Teams
Glantraeth were champions in the previous season and were promoted to the Cymru Alliance. They were replaced by Conwy Borough who were relegated from the Cymru Alliance.

The bottom two teams from the previous season, Llanrwst United and Glan Conwy, were relegated to Division 2 for 2017–18. Division 2 champions, Llandudno Albion and runners-up, Mynydd Llandegai were promoted in their place.

Grounds and locations

League table

Results

Division 2

Teams
Llandudno Albion were champions in the previous season and were promoted to Division 1 along with runners-up, Mynydd Llandegai. They were replaced by Glan Conwy who were relegated from Division 1.

The bottom two teams from the previous season were Blaenau Ffestiniog Amateur and Llannerch-y-medd. However, both teams were not relegated. Gwynedd League champions, Bodedern Athletic, runners-up, Aberffraw and Vale of Clwyd and Conwy Football League Premier Division champions, Llannefydd were promoted to Division 2.

Grounds and locations

League table

Results

References

Welsh Alliance League seasons
2017–18 in Welsh football